Muph & Plutonic is an Australian hip hop group. It is composed of MC Muphin (Dan Young, also known as "Muph") and DJ–drummer–producer Plutonic Lab (Leigh Ryan), both of whom released several solo albums before joining together to form a combined act in 2004.

Biography

Plutonic Lab

Leigh Ryan, better known by the stage name Plutonic Lab, began drumming at the age of 10 and performing shows at 14. He released his first solo album in 2001, with others to follow in 2004 and 2005. He has produced beats for many Australian and international artists and performed at a number of festivals.

Muphin
Dan Young, better known by the stage name Muphin (pronounced as "muffin") or Muph for short, first came to notice by winning the 2001 Victorian Verbal Mechanics Freestyle Battle Competition and since then performing countless live shows.

"I'm kind of an introverted guy, except for my music, that's my one main outlet where I feel comfortable saying whatever I feel. When I get up onstage, after the first few songs it feels like people know me in a way."

His reflective and conscious song writing had its debut release in 2003 with More Than Music. It was during the making of that album that Young forged a musical partnership with Ryan, which resulted in the official forming of their partnership, Muph & Plutonic.

Muph & Plutonic
Muph & Plutonic released their debut album, Hunger Pains, in November 2004 on Obese Records. Upon release, it was featured as "album of the week" by both radio station Triple J and by SBS radio's Alchemy program, and received favourable reviews. In addition, the single "Heaps Good" received significant airplay on Triple J and community radio, and was included Triple J's 2005 compilation album, Triple J: The Hip Hop Show.

Their second album, Silence the Sirens, was released in October 2006 and similarly received positive reviews.

Throughout 2007 and 2008 Muph & Plutonic extensively toured taking in a number of Australia's music festivals including Big Day Out, Falls Festival, Golden Plains, Kiss My Grass, Pyramid Rock and Triple J's 'AWOL' Karratha gig, alongside Powderfinger and The Grates. The Obese Block Party in May 2008 saw the introduction of DJ Bonez as the new Muph & Plutonic DJ, The Original DJ for Muph & Plutonic was DJ FX.

Their third album, And Then Tomorrow Came, released on 19 July 2008, was selected as the "Album of the Week" on Triple J for the week of 21–25 July. The album reached 46 on the Australian charts and was nominated for an ARIA Award in for Best Urban Release. Following the release of the album, Muph & Plutonic, with DJ Bonez, undertook a national tour throughout August, September and October 2008.

In 2010, Muph & Plutonic appeared with Candice Monique on the track "Goodbye Gravity" on M-Phazes' album Good Gracious.

Milk Bar Stars
Muph and Plutonic Lab also toured nationally in 2005, together with DJ Bonez and Obese Records boss Pegz, under the collective name Milk Bar Stars.

Discography

Albums

Solo albums

Plutonic Lab

Muphin

Awards and nominations

AIR Awards
The Australian Independent Record Awards (commonly known informally as AIR Awards) is an annual awards night to recognise, promote and celebrate the success of Australia's Independent Music sector.

|-
| 2007
|Muph & Plutonic 
| Most Oustsanding New Independent Artist
| 
|-
| 2008
|And Then Tomorrow Came 
| Best Independent Hip Hop Album
|

References

External links
 Obese Records - artist profile (Plutonic Lab)
 The Rap Cella - Muph & Plutonic Discography
 Australian Music Online - Muphin
 Obese Records - Muph & Plutonic
 Australian Music Online - Muph & Plutonic
 MySpace webpage - Muph & Plutonic

Australian hip hop groups
Obese Records artists
Hip hop duos